Mesosa curculionoides is a species of beetle in the family Cerambycidae, and the type species of its genus. It was described by Carl Linnaeus in 1761, originally under the genus Cerambyx. It has a wide distribution throughout Europe and in the Caucasus, and is also known from South Korea. It was formerly found in Belgium, where it is now extinct.

M.  curculionoides feeds on Larix decidua, Abies alba, Corylus avellana, Fagus sylvatica, and Castanea sativa.

Varietas
 Mesosa curculionoides var. biloculata (Nicolas, 1902)
 Mesosa curculionoides var. tokatensis (Pic, 1904)

References

curculionoides
Beetles described in 1761
Taxa named by Carl Linnaeus